SK Líšeň is a football club located in Brno, Czech Republic. It currently plays in the Czech National Football League, having won promotion from the Moravian–Silesian Football League in 2019.

Historical names
 1924 — SK Československý socialista Líšeň
 1936 — SK Líšeň
 1948 — ZKL Líšeň
 1951 — Spartak ZPS Líšeň
 1958 — Spartak Líšeň
 1990 — SK Líšeň

Players

Current squad
.

Out on loan

References

External links
 Official website 
 SK Líšeň at jihomoravskyfotbal.cz 

Football clubs in the Czech Republic
Association football clubs established in 1924
Sport in Brno